Pocket Dragon Adventures (Spanish: Pocket Dragons) is an animated series produced by the Spanish animation studio D'Ocon Films Productions, in co-production with Televisión Española, Bohbot Entertainment, and DIC Productions. The series is based on the Pocket Dragon character created by artist Real Musgrave, best known from Pocket Dragons figurines also based on his work. The cartoon is about the Pocket Dragons (a group of very small dragons) who live with a kindly old wizard, and their many adventures. The show premiered in early 1998 in the United States on the Bohbot Kids Network syndicated programming strand.

The show itself was created by Craig Miller and Marv Wolfman, who produced and story edited the series. Together or separately, they wrote over 40% of the total number of episodes. Pocket Dragon Adventures was also the first animated series signed to a labor contract with the Writers Guild of America.

Synopsis
The setting is shown to be in the Medieval era, with other elements thrown in, often bizarre ones (e.g., yellow-painted taxicabs pulled by rhinoceroses). Stories have included standard Medieval fare, such as armored knights, and some science fiction elements, such as flying saucers.

Characters

Pocket Dragons
 Filbert, who wears a red bandanna around his neck, is the largest and oldest of the six Pocket Dragons, and assumes the role of leader, even though he's seldom in control of the others. Voiced by Ian James Corlett.
 Zoom-Zoom, who wears an old-style aviator's helmet, wishes that he could fly, despite the Pocket Dragons' inability to fly. He's the fastest runner of the group. Voiced by Jason Gray-Stanford.
 Specs, who wears a pair of human-sized eyeglasses balanced on his nose, is the bookworm of the bunch. He has a crush on the Princess. Voiced by Samuel Vincent.
 Scribbles, one of the two female Dragons, is a somewhat scatterbrained inventor whose creations tend to cause more problems than they solve. She and Specs disagree as to which of them is smarter. She wears a special quiver in which she carries a pencil. Scribbles often fills in the leadership position when Filbert is incapacitated. Voiced by Kathleen Barr.
 Binky, the other female, is the smallest and youngest of the six dragons. In one episode, "Attack of the 50 Foot Binky", she wanted to be as tall as Filbert, so she used a growth potion and because she didn't put a limitation on it, she gradually grew bigger until the others found the antidote. Despite her childlike qualities, she sometimes surprises the others with her competence and clear-headedness. She's the only one who usually wears nothing. Voiced by Tabitha St. Germain.
 Cuddles, who wears bedroom slippers and carries a pillow, is usually either drowsy or sleeping. Sometimes when he sleeps, he "sleep-plays" that he's a daring adventurer named Sir Cuddles; he snaps out of this and wakes up whenever someone says "Cushladoo". Voiced by Venus Terzo in Season 1 and Terry Klassen in Season 2.

Other characters
 Wizard, who owns the castle in which the Dragons live, is a kindly, avuncular fellow who watches over them and tries to keep them from getting into too much trouble. An accomplished magician, he has a vast library and a laboratory in the castle. Voiced by Christopher Gaze.
 Library Cat is a winged-cat who is the wizard's familiar and a helpful companion to the pocket dragons. The cat also wears spectacles.
 Theobearus is a living teddy bear, who occasionally aids the pocket dragons.
 Sparkles is a full-sized dragon who's not very bright. He's able to float through the air by inflating himself like a balloon. Voiced by Robert O. Smith.
 Princess Betty Bye Belle runs the town library; when the former librarian retired, the Princess offered to let him live in the royal castle while she took over the library, because of her love of literature. She seems to be aware of Specs' feelings toward her, although she sees him more as a friend. Voiced by Saffron Henderson.
 Shmahz, a short wizard who hates the Dragons for disrupting his evil schemes and often tries to get revenge on them.
 Sir Nigel is a full-sized dragon who's a friend of the Wizard and the Pocket Dragons. He's a figure of culture and learning. Voiced by Garry Chalk.
 Trafalgar is a villainous full-sized dragon, who takes tips on how to be evil from his guidebook.
 The Pie-Rats are a trio of rodent thieves named Cuda, Wuda, and Shuda who specialise in stealing pastries.
 Gnorman the Gnome is a bumbling, sometimes villainous, sometimes helpful character. The "G"'s in his name are not silent (it is pronounced "G-norman the G-nome"). His brother is called Gnasty and his sister is called Gnoxious. Voiced by Brian Drummond.
 Chumley is Sir Nigel's bumbling artistic brother, he has a Welsh accent and is based on a Welsh Dragon.

Cast
 Ian James Corlett as Filbert
 Jason Gray-Stanford as Zoom-Zoom
 Samuel Vincent as Specs
 Kathleen Barr as Scribbles
 Tabitha St. Germain as Binky
 Venus Terzo as Cuddles (earlier episodes)
 Terry Klassen as Cuddles (later episodes)
 Christopher Gaze as the Wizard
 Robert O. Smith as Sparkles
 Saffron Henderson as Princess Betty Bye Bell

Additional voices
 Long John Baldry
 Jay Brazeau
 Don Brown
 Garry Chalk
 Michael Dobson
 Jesse Moss
 Richard Newman
 Mark Oliver
 Doug Parker
 Bill Reiter
 Russell Roberts
 French Tickner
 Lee Tockar
 David Ward
 Alec Willows
 Dale Wilson

Production 
Each half-hour episode contained two 11-minute cartoons. The stories contained some educational quality, but were mostly written for fun and imagination. The plots usually involved the Pocket Dragons getting into some kind of mess, either due to their own actions or those of others, and going through some wild and crazy situations while trying to make things right.

Some of the episodes' plots and titles are parodies of movies or TV shows, such as the episodes "Binky, Warrior Princess", and "Attack of the 50 Foot Binky".

104 eleven-minute episodes were produced. They aired as 52 half-hour episodes in the US, with some countries airing them as 15-minute programs (in the UK, for example, the series ran seven days a week on BBC1 and BBC2 for six years).

Episodes

Release
Pocket Dragon Adventures has been released on DVD in the US and in other countries (including the United Kingdom, France, etc.) but availability is limited. DVDs contain selected episodes only. The entire series is currently available on the free streaming platforms Tubi, Pluto TV, and Peacock. In the United Kingdom, the show currently airs on London Live as part of Bounce!.

References

External links

Description of the show (via Internet Archive)
An information site, with episode titles, voice actors, etc.
Pocket Dragon Heaven

1998 American television series debuts
1998 Spanish television series debuts
Animated television series about dragons
1990s American animated television series
Spanish children's animated fantasy television series
American children's animated fantasy television series
Australian Broadcasting Corporation original programming
Works by Len Wein
1990s Canadian animated television series
BBC children's television shows
Fox Kids
Treehouse TV original programming
YTV (Canadian TV channel) original programming